The women's 10,000 metres event at the 2015 European Athletics U23 Championships was held in Tallinn, Estonia, at Kadriorg Stadium on 10 July.

Medalists

Results

Final
10 July

Participation
According to an unofficial count, 15 athletes from 11 countries participated in the event.

References

10,000 metres
10,000 metres at the European Athletics U23 Championships